Chiropsella is a genus of cnidarians belonging to the family Chiropsellidae.

The species of this genus are found in Australia.

Species:

Chiropsella bart 
Chiropsella bronzie 
Chiropsella rudloei 
Chiropsella saxoni

References

Chiropsellidae
Medusozoa genera